Xanth is a series of novels by author Piers Anthony, also known as The Magic of Xanth. 

Anthony originally intended for Xanth to be a trilogy, but a devoted fan base persuaded the author to continue writing the series, which is now open-ended. He has stated that he has kept the series going as long as he has because the Xanth novels are "just about all that publishers want" from him.

The novels are set in the fantasy world of Xanth, in which magic exists and every human has a magical "talent." The books have been noted for their extensive use of wordplay and puns.

Since the peak of its popularity in the 1970s and 1980s, the series has been criticized by many scholars and reviewers for what they characterize as misogynist and pedophilic undertones; one reviewer has called it the "most divisive non-media publishing enterprise in all
of fantasy." Anthony has downplayed these critiques.

The series was optioned in 2017 for a film and TV series.

Books 

As of October 2021, there are 45 published novels.

World of Xanth

Inhabitants and talents 

Each human character in Xanth is born with a unique magical ability, called a talent. With the exception of the curse fiends, the winged centaurs, and the child Surprise Golem (Daughter of Rapunzel and Grundy Golem), these abilities never repeat exactly in individuals throughout the entire history of Xanth (although nearly identical talents show up on occasion). Though many talents are limited in scope (called the "spot-on-a-wall" variety), the series focuses mainly on individuals with "Magician" caliber abilities (one of the criteria for serving as King of Xanth).

In addition to the human characters, Xanth is populated by elves, centaurs, demons, dragons, fauns, gargoyles, goblins, golems, harpies, merfolk, naga, nymphs, ogres, zombies, curse fiends, and other fictional beasts. Though initially introduced as obstacles to the human characters, some individuals from those groups become main characters in later books of the series.

As the series progresses, some of the half-human species are discovered to have the potential to possess magical talents. The centaurs of the primary centaur community, Centaur Isle, exile any centaurs who demonstrate a magical talent (although some centaur communities are more lenient about possession of talent); however, they tolerate talents in "lesser" races such as humans. Goblins and harpies are shown to have the potential to possess half-talents, the complementary half existing in a member of the other species, (i.e., a goblin must team with a harpy for them to utilize their talent); the hostility between goblins and harpies proved a major obstacle to any serious effort by them to work together to develop these potential talents. Other non-human species are also known to possess talents, for example: Sesame Serpent and Claire Voyant. Visitors from other dimensions with talents retain their talents after arriving in Xanth.

Geography 

Geographically, modern Xanth resembles the state of Florida in the United States in shape, but has landmarks that mimic well-known geographical features from around the world. One major example of this is the Gap Chasm, an enormous canyon a mile wide which completely bisects the country, paralleling the DMZ of the Korean Peninsula. The position of the Chasm could also correspond with the Cross Florida Barge Canal, which, similar to the chasm, is generally forgotten except for those who stumble upon it. The Gap is guarded by a resident dragon, known as Stanley Steamer, and is crossed by means of treacherous bridges. Many of Xanth's other geographical features are puns on those of Florida (for example, Lake Ogre-Chobee and the Kiss-Mee River). The Florida Keys also exist, though they are, in Xanth, actual keys. Other punning feature names include the Isle of View ("I love you"), Mount Ever-Rest (Mount Everest) and the Centaur Aisle (center aisle) created by a magician from the Centaur Isle. The moon is close enough that flying creatures may land there; the back side is sweet and honeyish, the visible side has turned sour and become curdled cheese, due to observing what has happened on Earth and Xanth. Plants may bear fruit of all descriptions (pie trees and shoe trees are common) or they may be carnivorous (such as the tangle trees), making travel in Xanth risky.

Xanth has a connection with the normal world, which is referred to as "Mundania"; its people are called "Mundanes". Although any citizen of Xanth can enter Mundania at any time through an isthmus in the northwest, Mundanes enter the isthmus in Xanth from random geographic locations and time periods throughout history. In other words, Xanth does not have a fixed location or time in the mundane world; and the timeline between Xanth and Mundania seems to jump backwards and forwards. However, Mundanes seem to have trouble finding Xanth on a consistent basis, making any travel to Xanth a somewhat rare occurrence. Despite these seeming difficulties, Xanth was colonized in several waves by groups of invaders and nomads from Mundania over the course of several centuries. The series ties these colonization events to actual historical events on Earth, most notably the Punic wars.

Adult Conspiracy 

First mentioned in Crewel Lye, the Adult Conspiracy is one of the prominent features of the Xanth world. In an interview with Moira Allen, Piers Anthony referred to the "Adult conspiracy to keep interesting things from children" as a literary device "parodying current societal conventions". Nearly all subsequent books contain references to the Conspiracy and its effects, particularly those novels in which the main characters are children.

At its core, the Adult Conspiracy seeks to protect children from knowledge that could bring them to great harm. The precise age for entering into the world of adults is age 18, corresponding to the age of majority in most places. The primary principle that inducts children into the Conspiracy is the understanding of the secret of "summoning the stork". In Xanthian terms, "summoning the stork" literally means to put out a call to summon a stork which will deliver to the couple a child. In Isle of View, it is revealed that summoning the stork will release an "ellipsis" (...) into the air to fly off to the stork. This is a play on the joke that all the "adult" things happen after a paragraph ends in an ellipsis. Most inductees actually discover the specifics of the act "by accident" after marriage, or under the influence of a love spring (a magical spring which causes two drinkers, not necessarily human, or even of the same species, to fall madly, and lustfully, in love with one another at first sight).

Other faculties of the Adult Conspiracy include:
Censorship of foul language – All foul words contain the ability to cause various effects (the wilting of plants (negative), removal of curse burrs (positive), etc.). These are automatically bleeped when said in the presence of someone who has yet to be inducted.
Visual access to underwear – Because underwear is so closely tied to sexuality (even more so than nudity in Xanth), men become automatically "freaked out" when they view panties. This is made a common joke, most prominently in the novel The Color of Her Panties, and is often used by women to gain advantage over men. Panties only carry their effects when worn, but because of their nature, they are forbidden to be shown to children.
Inability to have childish fun – Children believe that once they join the Adult Conspiracy, they will no longer have pillow fights, eat sweets and drink "tsoda popka" (soda pop), or want to have fun. While this belief is exaggerated, the entry to the Conspiracy does cause the couple to lose their bed monster, inadvertently creating the appearance of losing all childhood spirit under the responsibility of Adulthood.

It is important to note that there have been occasions when children gained access to the Adult Conspiracy prematurely. Jenny Elf, Che Centaur, and Gwenny Goblin had to be given access to the Adult Conspiracy when Gwenny received a pair of contact lenses that corrected her poor eyesight while giving her the ability to see others' dreams (some of which could contain Conspiracy material). In one rare instance, a little girl was born with the magic talent of immunity to the magical censorship of Adult Conspiracy, causing her family much distress. This was remedied with magician Sherlock's talent of reversal and a vial of lethe water which erased her memory.

Related works 

Encyclopedia of Xanth (1987, by Jody Lynn Nye) a Crossroads Adventure role-playing game book
Ghost of a Chance (1988, by Jody Lynn Nye) a Crossroads Adventure role-playing game book
Piers Anthony's Visual Guide to Xanth (1989, with Jody Lynn Nye)
 "Xanth" Board Game (1991, created by Mayfair Games, a board game for 1-6 players set in the Xanth Universe)
Companions of Xanth (a 1993 video game described in and following the plot of Demons Don't Dream)
Letters to Jenny (1993, nonfiction)

References

Sources 

Piers Anthony's Bibliography List
Ghost of a Chance (1988) by Jody Lyn Nye (A Crossroads Adventure in the World of Piers Anthony's Xanth)
Bio of an Ogre (1988) by Piers Anthony (Xanth: Part Five: Number 4 p. 213)

External links 

 Xanth on Hipiers.com
 
 I was a captive of Xanth a review of the from Salon (December 7, 2000)
 The timeline of Xanth

 
Fictional countries
Zombies and revenants in popular culture
Book series introduced in 1977
Fantasy novel series
Novels by Piers Anthony
Peninsulas